Amistades Peligrosas may refer to:
 Amistades Peligrosas (band), a Spanish band
 Amistades peligrosas (TV series), a Spanish television series